Oberea fuscipennis is a species of beetle in the family Cerambycidae. It was described by Chevrolat in 1852.

Subspecies
 Oberea fuscipennis fuscipennis Chevrolat, 1852
 Oberea fuscipennis fairmairei Aurivillius, 1921
 Oberea fuscipennis perakensis Breuning, 1961
 Oberea fuscipennis infratestacea Pic, 1936

References

fuscipennis
Beetles described in 1852